Rescued by Ruby is a 2022 American biographical drama film directed by Katt Shea. Its story follows a state trooper named Dan, who dreams of joining the K-9 search and rescue team of the state police, however has been unsuccessful in doing so until he befriends a shelter dog named Ruby. The film is based on a true story. The film was released on March 17, 2022, by Netflix.

Plot 
Ruby is an extremely hyperactive half border collie that has been adopted seven times from the shelter she has been in over the last six months, but always later returned due to an inability to train or control her.

Rhode Island state trooper Daniel O'Neil has dreamed of joining the K-9 search and rescue team of the state police. However, he has been rejected seven times and he only has one last chance to qualify before he turns 30, as all applicants have to be under 30.

Daniel learns that the K-9 unit has no funds to import any more German Shepherds, the breed usually used in search and rescue teams, and therefore he would not be able to join the program. He finds out his wife Melissa is pregnant with their second child, making him even more determined to go for it because the promotion would also improve his pay and benefits.

Pat, an advocate at the shelter, begs her workmate Rick to give Ruby a little more time. He announces that in the evening they will put her down. Dan discovers a K-9 dog does not have to be a German Shepherd, but is curious, agile and spirited. Then he visits the shelter, and Pat convinces him to adopt Ruby to train her and join the program.

The story then follows Dan's attempts to train Ruby, their failures and their successes. They both are high-energy, enthusiastic and have to discover how to work together effectively.

Sergeant Zarella explains that after an entry exam, those accepted do six weeks of intensive training. To enter, the dog and the owner must have the right temperament, focus, calmness and compassion. Ruby does well until finally, impatient, she wiggles free, disturbing a bee's nest. Out of the official training, Mel reminds Dan he got through the police academy with dyslexia and hyperactivity, so maybe he should try homeschooling Ruby.

At the exam at six weeks, Ruby passes. They wait for months on their junior team, until finally they are needed. Sent to a home where a murder victim is meant to be, Ruby senses human remains, but Dan can't find them. Disappointed, he ignores her, dejected. She runs off during the night, only to have Zarella tell him the remains were found at the scene where Ruby indicated, but buried beneath concrete. Zarella tells Dan it was amazing that Ruby caught the scent, and he should have trusted his K9 partner. Dan frantically searches for Ruby, finally finding her.

Dan and Ruby join the search teams seeking Michael, a boy who got lost while hiking. They find him in the rain and dark, and the boy turns out to be Pat's son. Pat thanks Dan and Ruby and Dan is promoted to full K-9 officer.

Cast 
 Grant Gustin as Daniel O'Neil
 Bear as Ruby
 Scott Wolf as Sergeant Matt Zarrella
 Kaylah Zander as Melissa O’Neil
 Camille Sullivan as Pat Inman
 Tom McBeath as Seamus Brady
 Sharon Taylor as Sam
 Eileen Pedde as Sergeant Amanda Grinnell
 Jude Culham-Keays as Michael
 Giacomo Baessato as Rick McGuinness

Production 
On February 2021, it was announced that Grant Gustin would star in the film.

Release 
The film was released on Netflix on March 17.

Reception 
On review aggregator website Rotten Tomatoes, the film has an approval rating of 100% based on 5 reviews, with an average rating of 6.9/10.

On the week from 21 to 28 of March, the film had 311 million viewing minutes, ranking fourth on Nielsen’s top movie chart of that week, and on Netflix's Top 10 English-language films, it placed second.

References

External links 
 
 

2022 films
2022 biographical drama films
2020s English-language films
American biographical drama films
English-language Netflix original films
Films about dogs
Films directed by Katt Shea
2020s American films